Kristen Nikolai Valkner (2 June 1903 – 25 January 1972) was a Norwegian priest and church historian.

He was born in Bergen, and graduated with the cand.theol. degree in 1927. He was appointed vicar in Skånevik in 1928, but returned to academia as he became docent in church history at the University of Oslo in 1946. He was promoted to professor in 1964, and retired in 1972. Notable books include Norges kirkehistorie 1500–1800 (1951), Mesteren fra Møre (1958) and Kirkestriden i Norge. Belyst ved Lyder Bruns brev til F. C. Krarup 1905–1931 (1968).

References

1903 births
20th-century Norwegian Lutheran clergy
20th-century Norwegian historians
Reformation historians
Academic staff of the University of Oslo
Clergy from Bergen
1972 deaths